Moutere Mahue / Antipodes Island Marine Reserve is a marine reserve covering an area of  around the Antipodes Islands south of New Zealand's South Island and Stewart Island / Rakiura. It was established in 2014 and is administered by the New Zealand Department of Conservation.

The Māori name of the marine reserve and island group, Moutere Mahue, translates as “abandoned” or “deserted” island, referring to its isolation and remoteness. The English name, Antipodes Islands, refers to the main island being antipodal to London.

Geography

The island group is made up of volcanic cones and vents, with sheer cliffs rising to a tussock-strewn plateau. Below water, the cliff supports large numbers of sessile (stationary) marine invertebrates and a diverse range of seaweeds.

History

The marine reserve was established on 2 March 2014.

Moutere Ihupuku / Campbell Island Marine Reserve and Moutere Hauriri / Bounty Islands Marine Reserve were established at the same time under the same law.

Flora and fauna

The island group may have the highest underwater species diversity of any of New Zealand's subantarctic islands due to its clear water and proximity to the edge of an undersea plateau. Many of these species are found nowhere else in the world.

The animals provide a crucial food source for onshore species, including the Antipodean albatross, large colonies of erect-crested and eastern rockhopper penguins, southern elephant seals and New Zealand fur seals.

The extensive underwater rock walls are covered in bright pink layers of rare coralline algae seaweeds, and many invertebrates like sea sponges, anemones and bryozoans cling densely to the walls. Hundreds of seaweed species have been identified including some that are yet to be discovered. Endemic bull kelp beds down to over 20 metres deep, reaching up to four metres long.

There are some near-shore fish including the Antarctic cod (small-scaled notothenid). Species like ling and the Patagonian toothfish have been recorded further from the shore.

Recreation

The marine reserve can only be accessed by boat and visitors require a permit. Guided tours are available.

See also
 Marine reserves of New Zealand

References

Marine reserves of New Zealand
Protected areas of New Zealand
2014 establishments in New Zealand
Protected areas established in 2014
Antipodes Islands